The optical materials, photonics and systems laboratory (LMOPS) gathers researchers from Lorraine university and from CentraleSupélec,, in the cities of Metz, Saint-Avold and Thionville. The research themes lie in the fields of materials in general and optical materials more specifically, non linear optics, optical sensors and photovoltaics. Almost 30 researchers are working in the laboratory, side by side with roughly the same number of PhD students. The LMOPS was created in the year 2000, building from its ancestor, the Laboratoire Matériaux optiques à propriétés spécifiques, which belonged to the Metz university, which teamed with Supélec in 2000.

Whereabouts 
The LMOPS laboratory is spread over 4 cities:
 Its central part is situated in the Technopôle de Metz within the Metz campus of CentraleSupélec
 A second site in Metz is hosted by the Sciences fondamentales et appliquées Lorraine university unit, within the Institute for Material Physics and Chemistry
 the Saint-Avold site is hosted by the Institut universitaire de technologie de Moselle-Est, within the Lorraine university
  the Thionville site is hosted by the Institut universitaire de technologie de Thionville-Yutz within the Lorraine university.

Research teams 
The research activities within the LMOPS are structured through 4 research teams.
 The Functional Materials team deals with materials in general, particularly optical materials and polymers
 The Photonics team is mainly devoted to non linear optics
 The Raman sensors & Optical control team has a strong background in Raman spectroscopy
 The Photovoltaics team studies materials and systems for the harvesting of solar energy

Facilities 

The LMOPS laboratory can rely on many optical spectrometers. One of the team is specialized in Raman Spectroscopy and thus works with many kinds of Raman spectrometers. In the laboratory can also be found absorption spectrometers, as well as X fluorescence spectrometers.

The electrical characterization of materials and devices is also an important aspect of the LMOPS activities. Facilities are available for measuring current-voltage curves, as a function of temperature if necessary, for determining the charge carriers, and for measuringcapacity-voltage and impedance curves.

Finally, and omitting the many Laser sources which are always needed in such a laboratory, the LMOPS can rely on heavy equipment far actual material fabrication, such as ovens using the Czochralski process to grow bulk non linear crystals which are to be used for laser frequency doubling, as well as MOVPE equipments for the deposition of thin layers of semi-conductors. These heavy equipments are completed by a lightweight micro-pulling down crystalline fibre machine.

References and notes 

University of Lorraine